Haa Alif Atoll is the code name based on the letters of the Maldivian alphabet commonly used to refer to the administrative division officially known as North Thiladhunmathi Atoll (Maldivian: Thiladhunmathi Uthuruburi) in the Maldives.

It is the northernmost of the 19 administrative divisions (known as "Atolls") of the country, and is the third-largest administrative division in terms of population and land area.

This administrative division consists of Ihavandhippolhu, the northernmost geographical atoll of the Maldive archipelago, and the northern section of Thiladhunmathi atoll. The capital of North Thiladhunmathi Atoll is the island of Dhidhdhoo where the Secretariat of North Thiladhunmathi Atoll Council is located.

Geography
The Northern Thiladhunmathi Atoll administrative division consists of a total of 43 islands spread over two natural geographic atolls, namely Northern Thiladhunmathi, and Ihavandhippolhu.

Northern Thiladhunmathi is the northernmost portion of the huge Thiladhunmathi Atoll. Thiladhunmathi Atoll was administratively divided into northern and southern divisions in 1958.

Ihavandhippolhu lies to the north of Northern Thiladhunmathi, with the Ihavandhoo Kandu channel separating the two, and is the northernmost atoll of the Maldives. It is a small natural atoll 22 km in length. It has 25 islands lying all around the boundary reef. One long barrier reef forms the western side of the atoll. There are several coral patches in the lagoon and the general depth in the centre is 20 to 30 fathoms (35 to 55 m).

Ihavandhippolhu is separated from the Lakshadweep Islands of India by the broad channel known as Māmalē Kandu (or Maliku Kandu).

5

Islands
Of the 43 islands in the North Thiladhunmathi Atoll administrative division, 14 of them are inhabited and are classified as administrative island constituencies. Each of these constituencies have an island council which responds to the North Thiladhunmathi Atoll Council which has its headquarters on Dhidhdhoo.

Island constituencies

Uninhabited Islands
All uninhabited islands in Haa Alif Atoll are under the control of the North Thiladhunmathi Atoll Council.

Resort Islands

Other Uninhabited Islands

Disappeared Islands
These are islands which during recorded history, have been completely eroded away, claimed by the sea due to the sea-level rise associated with global warming or assimilated by other islands.
Gasthirifinolhu
Gudhanfushi
Huraa
Nasfaru
Thiladhoo (merged into Dhidhdhoo, it was after this island that the atoll got its name of 'Thiladhunmathi')
Thinadhoo

Administration

Atoll Council

The North Thiladhunmathi Atoll administrative division is governed by an Atoll Council. The atoll council was created in 2011 with the enactment of the Decentralization Bill, which saw the introduction of local governance to the country. The secretariat of the atoll council is located on Dhidhdhoo.

The atoll is further divided up into 5 political wards each with one councillor.

Members

History
In Matheerah there is a famous shrine (ziyaraiy, mausoleum) which was visited formerly by the Maldive kings and their families in order to seek blessings. Such tomb visits are aspects of Sufism that existed among the Maldivians until very recent times. Hence this island was referred to with the honorific title Matheerahffulhu (High (noble) Island) by the Sufi Muslims of the Maldives at that time.

Traditionally the northernmost atoll of the Maldives was Minicoy (Maliku).  Fishermen from Thuraakunu and from Minicoy often crossed the Maliku Kandu on their boats to visit each other's islands. Marriage alliances were common. Now Minicoy is a part of India and communication is highly restricted.

As an administrative division, North Thiladhunmathi Atoll was created when the huge natural Thiladhunmathi Atoll was administratively divided into northern and southern divisions in 1958.

References

 Divehi Tārīkhah Au Alikameh. Divehi Bahāi Tārikhah Khidmaiykurā Qaumī Markazu. Reprint 1958 edn. Malé 1990.
 Divehiraajjege Jōgrafīge Vanavaru. Muhammadu Ibrahim Lutfee. G.Sōsanī.
 Xavier Romero-Frias, The Maldive Islanders, A Study of the Popular Culture of an Ancient Ocean Kingdom. Barcelona 1999.

Administrative atolls of the Maldives